Up in Arms is a 1944 musical film directed by Elliott Nugent and starring Danny Kaye and Dinah Shore. It was nominated for two Academy Awards in 1945.

Plot
Danny Weems works as an elevator operator in a New York Medical building, so he can be close to doctors and nurses and get free advice on his supposed illnesses. The doctors know him well and consider him a hypochondriac. So, when he is drafted into the US Army for war service, he is devastated. His best friend Joe gets himself also drafted so he can keep an eye on Danny.

Danny is in love with nurse Mary Morgan, but she is really in love with Joe, and Joe's girl Virginia is secretly in love with Danny. The boys get through basic training, and as they embark by ship to the South Pacific, they discover that Mary and Virginia have also enlisted as army nurses. As officers, though, they cannot fraternize with the boys.

Danny contrives to smuggle Mary on board, and during the voyage, he tries to keep her hidden, but the truth eventually comes out and Danny is hauled before Colonel Ashley – who has him sent to the brig.

When the troops are landed on a Pacific island, Danny is again imprisoned, but is "rescued" by a Japanese patrol. They try to interrogate him, but Danny manages to bamboozle them and eventually impersonates the commander. He gives orders that the soldiers surrender to the Americans – and they obey orders to the letter, and Danny is a hero.

Cast
 Danny Kaye as Danny Weems
 Dinah Shore as Nurse Lt. Virginia Merrill 
 Dana Andrews as Joe Nelson 
 Constance Dowling as Nurse Lt. Mary Morgan
 Louis Calhern as Col. Phil Ashley
 Margaret Dumont as Mrs. Willoughby

Production notes
 Production dates: late June–late September 1943
 The working title of this film was With Flying Colors. 
 All of the actresses who played nurses in Up in Arms are listed collectively onscreen as "The Goldwyn Girls." 
 Danny Kaye's character was based on the character "The Nervous Wreck" from the play of the same name by Owen Davis, which opened in New York in 1923. The play, which bears little resemblance to the film, was in turn based on the 1921 magazine serial The Wreck by Edith J. Rath and Sam H. Harris, which was published as a novel called The Nervous Wreck in 1923. In 1928, Florenz Ziegfeld staged a musical version of Davis' play called Whoopee! starring Eddie Cantor (film version, 1930).
 Up in Arms marked the motion picture feature debut of Broadway star Danny Kaye (1911–1987), and opened to uniformly rave reviews. The popular star, who began on Broadway in 1939, had already turned down a contract with Metro-Goldwyn-Mayer when he was cast in Up in Arms. After this film, Kaye became an international success and he went on to do four more pictures in succession with Sam Goldwyn before moving on to Warner Bros., 20th Century Fox and Paramount Pictures.
 Harold Arlen & Ted Koehler contributed 3 songs to the film; "All Out For Freedom", "Now I Know" & "Tess's Torch Song".

Reception
At the 17th Academy Awards on March 15, 1945, Up in Arms was nominated in the Music (Scoring of a Musical Picture) and Music (Song-"Now I Know") categories. The film earned theatrical rentals of $3,015,000 in the United States and Canada and $1,700,000 overseas for a worldwide total of $4,715,000.

References

External links
 
 
 
 

1944 films
Films directed by Elliott Nugent
Samuel Goldwyn Productions films
Films scored by Max Steiner
Military humor in film
1944 musical comedy films
World War II films made in wartime
Pacific War films
American musical comedy films